The British Academy consists of world-leading scholars and researchers in the humanities and social sciences. Each year, it elects fellows to its membership. The following were elected in the 1970s.

1970
The following were elected to the fellowship at the Academy's annual general meeting in 1970:

 Professor J. N. D. Anderson
 Professor A. H. Armstrong
 Professor Frank Barlow
 Professor C. N. L. Brooke
 Professor Thomas Burrow
 Dr G. H. S. Bushnell
 Dr C. F. Carter
 D. G. Champernowne
 Rev. F. C. Copleston
 J. A. Crook
 J. P. W. Ehrman
 Professor Denys Hay
 M. E. Howard
 Dr M. G. Kendall
 Hon. Sir Robert Megarry
 O. N. Millar
 Professor Kenneth Muir
 Professor Roy Pascal
 D. F. Pears
 Rev. Professor E. G. Rupp
 Dr C. H. V. Sutherland

1971 
The following were elected to the fellowship at the Academy's annual general meeting in 1971:

 Professor W. S. Allen
 Professor C. R. Bawden
 Professor J. A. W. Bennett
 T. A. M. Bishop
 P. R. L. Brown
 Professor F. L. Carsten
 Professor S. A. de Smith
 Dr M. H. Dobb
 Professor M. I. Finley
 Professor S. S. Frere
 Professor F. J. H. Haskell
 M. B. Hesse
 Rev. Professor J. Kinsley
 Professor W. G. Lambert
 Dr G. Marshall
 Dr J. Needham
 Dr W. F. Oakeshott
 Capt S. W. Roskill, RN (ret.)
 Professor N. Rubinstein
 D. A. F. M. Russell
 Professor L. B. Schapiro
 Professor B. A. O. Williams

1972 
The following were elected fellows at the annual general meeting in 1972:

 Dr G. E. H. Abraham
 Rev. Professor G. W. Anderson
 Professor A. E. Anton
 Professor A. J. Brown
 Professor D. C. Coleman
 G. E. M. de Ste Croix
 Professor C. Dionisotti-Casalone
 Professor J. H. Elliott
 Dr R. A. Higgins
 Professor A. M. Honoré
 Dr E. R. Leach
 Professor J. H. Le Patourel
 Dr R. M. Ogilvie
 Dr A. J. Taylor
 Professor R. M. Titmuss
 Professor William Watson
 Sir John Wheeler-Bennett
 Professor Elizabeth Wilkinson
 Professor R. A. Wollheim

1973 
The following were elected fellows at the annual general meeting in 1973:

 Professor Max Beloff
 Professor F. F. Bruce
 Rev. Dr G. B. Caird
 Dr P. T. V. M. Chaplais
 L. J. Cohen
 Professor R. Davis
 Professor E. J. Dobson
 Professor C. R. Dodwell
 Professor J. D. Evans
 Professor J. F. Kermode
 Mary Leakey
 D. M. Lewis
 Professor I. M. D. Little
 Professor John Lyons
 Professor P. N. S. Mansergh
 Dr L. E. R. Picken
 Sir Leon Radzinowicz
 Professor J. C. Smith
 Dr Edmond Sollberger
 Professor Brinley Thomas
 Professor E. O. G. Turville-Petre
 Dr M. L. West
 Dr H. J. Plenderleith (under Supplemental Charter)

1974 
The following were elected fellows at the annual general meeting in 1974:

 J. G. Beckwith
 Professor R. D. C. Black
 Professor J. M. Cook
 Professor A. D. S. Fowler
 Professor E. A. Gellner
 Dr A. J. P. Kenny
 Professor M. Dominica Legge
 Professor F. S. L. Lyons
 J. L. Mackie
 F. A. Mann
 Rev. Dr E. L. Mascall
 Dr T. B. Mitford
 Professor E. E. D. M. Oates
 Professor D. Obolensky
 Professor H. S. Offler
 Dr Marjorie E. Reeves
 Professor P. G. Stein
 Dr Joan Thirsk
 Professor D. P. Walker

1975 
The following were elected fellows at the annual general meeting in 1975:

 Professor P. T. Bauer
 Professor A. D. E. Cameron
 Professor J. T. Coppock
 Professor R. H. C. Davis
 W. B. Dean
 Professor R. P. Dore
 Professor Margaret M. Gowing
 Professor F. H. Hahn
 G. D. G. Hall
 Professor P. M. Holt
 Professor Elie Kedourie
 Professor John Lough
 Professor F. R. Palmer
 P. M. R. Pouncey
 Professor R. C. Quirk
 Professor C. B. Ricks
 W. G. Runciman
 Dr J. E. Stevens
 Dame Veronica Wedgwood, OM, DBE
 Dr D. T. Whiteside

1976 
The following were elected fellows at the annual general meeting in 1976:

 Professor D. M. Arnold
 Professor Robert Auty
 Professor G. E. Aylmer
 D. E. Barrett
 Professor G. W. S. Barrow
 Dr R. L. S. Bruce-Mitford
 Professor Kenneth Cameron
 Professor R. M. Cook
 Professor Gordon Donaldson
 Professor William Empson
 Phillipa R. Foot
 Professor L. W. Forster
 Professor J. R. Goody
 Professor E. J. E. Hobsbawm
 T. G. H. James
 Professor David Lockwood
 Denis Mack Smith
 Professor C. A. Mango
 Professor F. G. B. Millar
 Dr J. C. T. Oates
 Professor D. S. Scott
 Professor John Shearman
 Stefan Strelcyn
 Professor D. M. Walker
 Professor Thomas Wilson

1977 
The following were elected fellows at the annual general meeting in 1977:

 Dr S. P. Brock
 Professor S. G. Checkland
 Professor I. R. Christie
 Professor J. N. Coldstream
 Professor R. Dahrendorf
 Professor C. J. F. Dowsett
 Professor J. Gottmann
 Professor J. A. G. Griffith
 Professor J. R. Hale
 Professor R. H. Hilton
 Professor J. B. Joll
 Kathleen Major
 Professor P. Mathias
 Dr P. R. S. Moorey
 L. B. Nicolson
 P. J. Parsons
 A. M. Quinton
 Professor P. E. L. Russell
 Professor A. K. Sen
 G. H. Treitel
 Rev. Professor R. McL. Wilson
 Professor B. S. Yamey

1978 
The following were elected fellows at the annual general meeting in 1978:

 Professor P. S. Atiyah
 Professor R. Browning
 A. R. M. Carr
 Dr M. Chibnall
 Professor N. Cohn
 Dr J. M. Coles
 D. F. Foxon
 Professor J. A. Gallagher
 Professor W. M. Gorman
 Professor A. R. Hall
 Professor J. C. Holt
 Dr C. M. Kraay
 Professor P. E. Lasko
 Professor I. D. McFarlane
 Professor D. M. MacKinnon
 Rev. Professor J. McManners
 Professor A. Nove
 Professor J. K. S. St Joseph
 Dr A. W. Tyson
 Professor D. R. P. Wiggins
 Professor J. E. Caerwyn Williams
 Dr M. Winterbottom

1979 
The following were elected fellows at the annual general meeting in 1979:

 Professor W. Brass
 Professor I. Brownlie
 Professor B. W. Cunliffe
 Professor R. M. Dworkin
 Professor R. Ellmann
 Rev. Professor J. A. Emerton
 J. A. G. Gere
 Professor C. Grayson
 P. Laslett
 Dr G. L. Lewis
 Professor H. R. Loyn
 Professor A. T. Peacock
 Professor A. M. Snodgrass
 Professor E. L. G. Stones
 Professor C. M. Taylor
 K. V. Thomas
 Professor F. M. L. Thompson
 G. D. N. Worswick

References